The 1871 Chicago White Stockings season was the second season of the Chicago White Stockings franchise, the first in the National Association of Professional Base Ball Players and the first at Union Base-Ball Grounds.

With the debut of the first professional baseball league, the National Association, the Chicago franchise joined up as the "White Stockings." The team went 19–9 and finished second in the league standings. Pitcher George Zettlein started all 28 of Chicago's games and led the NA with a 2.73 earned run average.

Near the end of the season, the team lost its stadiums and equipment when the Great Chicago Fire hit the city. The team was able to finish out the season on the road, but had to drop out of the league while the city attempted to recover. The team would not resurface until 1874.

Regular season

Season standings

Record vs. opponents

Roster

Player stats

Batting

Starters by position
Note: Pos = Position; G = Games played; AB = At bats; H = Hits; Avg. = Batting average; HR = Home runs; RBI = Runs batted in

Other batters
Note: G = Games played; AB = At bats; H = Hits; Avg. = Batting average; HR = Home runs; RBI = Runs batted in

Pitching

Starting pitchers
Note: G = Games pitched; IP = Innings pitched; W = Wins; L = Losses; ERA = Earned run average; SO = Strikeouts

Relief pitchers
Note: G = Games pitched; IP = Innings pitched; W = Wins; L = Losses; ERA = Earned run average; SO = Strikeouts

References 
1871 Chicago White Stockings season at Baseball Reference

Chicago Cubs seasons
Chicago White Stockings
1871 in Illinois